The New York Giants Radio Network is a broadcast radio network based in New York City, the official radio broadcaster of the National Football League's New York Giants. The network's radio broadcasts are currently flagshipped at WFAN, a station owned by Entercom Communications. Overflow radio casts air on WCBS, WFAN's corporate sibling.

The network distributes Giants home and away games to a network of 18 stations in three states. Bob Papa is the current play-by-play announcer, with former Giants linebacker Carl Banks as color analyst, and former Giants tight end Howard Cross as sideline reporter.

Stations

Flagship (2 stations)
WFAN/660: New York
WFAN-FM/101.9: New York

Affiliates (13 stations + 2 translators)

New York (11 stations + 2 translators)
WPYX/106.5: Albany
WAAL/99.1: Binghamton
WENI/1450: Corning
WPHD/98.7: Corning
WMAJ/1230: Elmira
WIXT/1230: Little Falls
W249BC/97.1: Mattydale (rebroadcasts WTLA at North Syracuse)
WTLA/1200: North Syracuse
WSGO/1440: Oswego
W261AC/100.1: Oswego (rebroadcasts WSGO)
WIRY/1340: Plattsburgh (Burlington, Vermont market) AM Stereo
WRNY/1350: Rome
WTLB/1310: Utica (Syracuse market)

Pennsylvania (1 station)
WEEX/1230: Easton, Pennsylvania

Connecticut (1 station)
WPOP/1410: Hartford

Former affiliates (3 stations)
WCGR/1550: Canandaigua, New York (2012-13 season)
WFLR/1570: Dundee, New York (2012-13 season)
WLEZ-LP/100.1 (now 98.1): Jackson, Mississippi (2009-10 season)

Broadcasters

2010s

2000s

1990s

1980s

References

External links
Official affiliates listing

National Football League on the radio
Sports radio networks in the United States